The Papuan epaulette shark, Hemiscyllium hallstromi, is a bamboo shark in the family Hemiscylliidae found around southern Papua New Guinea, between latitudes 7° S and 10° S, and longitude 144° E and 146° E.  Its length is up to 75 cm.

Reproduction is oviparous.

Etymology
The shark is named in honor of philanthropist Edward Hallstrom (1886–1970), a trustee and chairman of Taronga Zoological Park, where holotype and paratype were kept alive in captivity.

See also

 List of sharks
 Carpet shark

References

 
 Compagno, Dando, & Fowler, Sharks of the World, Princeton University Press, New Jersey 2005 

Papuans epaulette shark
Fish of Papua New Guinea
Taxa named by Gilbert Percy Whitley
Papuans epaulette shark